Stephen Cairfield Dubois (born 1 February 1940) is an Australian retired politician. Born in Vanuatu, he was the legislative assistant to Labor MP Bill Morrison. In 1984, Morrison retired, and Dubois succeeded him in the seat of St George in the Australian House of Representatives, also representing the Labor Party. He held the seat until its abolition in 1993, at which time he retired after losing a preselection contest for the new seat of Watson to Leo McLeay who was then the Speaker of the House of Representatives.

References

Australian Labor Party members of the Parliament of Australia
Members of the Australian House of Representatives for St George
Members of the Australian House of Representatives
1940 births
Living people
Vanuatuan emigrants to Australia
20th-century Australian politicians